The WIPO Performances and Phonograms Treaty (or WPPT) is an international treaty signed by the member states of the World Intellectual Property Organization and was adopted in Geneva on 20 December 1996. It came into effect on 20 May 2002. As of August 2021, the treaty has been 109 contracting parties.

WPPT was adopted with an objective to develop and maintain the protection of the rights of performers and producers of phonograms in a manner as effective and uniform as possible. This treaty would not disturb the existing obligations that Contracting Parties have to each other under the International Convention for the Protection of Performers, Producers of Phonograms and Broadcasting Organizations done in Rome, 26 October 1961 (Rome Convention). Articles 18 and 19 of the WPPT provide similar obligations for performers and producers of phonograms to contracting states as provided under Articles 11 and 12 of the WCT.

The Digital Millennium Copyright Act is the United States's implementation of the treaty (see WIPO Copyright and Performances and Phonograms Treaties Implementation Act).

See also
List of parties to the WIPO Performances and Phonograms Treaty
Geneva Phonograms Convention
WIPO Copyright Treaty (WCT)

References

External links

 The full text of the WIPO Performances and Phonograms Treaty  in the WIPO Lex database — official website of WIPO.

Copyright treaties
Performances and Phonograms Treaty
Treaties concluded in 1996
Treaties entered into force in 2002
Treaties of Albania
Treaties of Argentina
Treaties of Armenia
Treaties of Australia
Treaties of Austria
Treaties of Azerbaijan
Treaties of Bahrain
Treaties of Belgium
Treaties of Benin
Treaties of Bosnia and Herzegovina
Treaties of Botswana
Treaties of Bulgaria
Treaties of Burkina Faso
Treaties of Canada
Treaties of Chile
Treaties of the People's Republic of China
Treaties of Colombia
Treaties of Costa Rica
Treaties of Croatia
Treaties of Cyprus
Treaties of the Czech Republic
Treaties of Denmark
Treaties of the Dominican Republic
Treaties of Ecuador
Treaties of El Salvador
Treaties of Estonia
Treaties entered into by the European Union
Treaties of Finland
Treaties of France
Treaties of Gabon
Treaties of Georgia (country)
Treaties of Germany
Treaties of Greece
Treaties of Guatemala
Treaties of Guinea
Treaties of Honduras
Treaties extended to Hong Kong
Treaties of Hungary
Treaties of Indonesia
Treaties of Italy
Treaties of Jamaica
Treaties of Japan
Treaties of Jordan
Treaties of Kazakhstan
Treaties of South Korea
Treaties of Kyrgyzstan
Treaties of Latvia
Treaties of Liechtenstein
Treaties of Lithuania
Treaties of Luxembourg
Treaties of North Macedonia
Treaties of Madagascar
Treaties of Malaysia
Treaties of Mali
Treaties of Malta
Treaties of Mexico
Treaties of Moldova
Treaties of Mongolia
Treaties of Montenegro
Treaties of Morocco
Treaties of the Netherlands
Treaties of Nicaragua
Treaties of Oman
Treaties of Panama
Treaties of Paraguay
Treaties of Peru
Treaties of the Philippines
Treaties of Poland
Treaties of Portugal
Treaties of Qatar
Treaties of Romania
Treaties of Russia
Treaties of Saint Lucia
Treaties of Saint Vincent and the Grenadines
Treaties of Senegal
Treaties of Serbia and Montenegro
Treaties of Singapore
Treaties of Slovakia
Treaties of Slovenia
Treaties of Spain
Treaties of Sweden
Treaties of Switzerland
Treaties of Tajikistan
Treaties of Togo
Treaties of Trinidad and Tobago
Treaties of Turkey
Treaties of Ukraine
Treaties of the United Arab Emirates
Treaties of the United Kingdom
Treaties of the United States
Treaties of Uruguay
1996 in Switzerland
Treaties extended to Greenland
Treaties extended to the Faroe Islands